Aulonemia deflexa is a species of bamboo in the genus Aulonemia.
The species is part of the grass family and is endemic to Latin America.

References

deflexa
Taxa named by N. E. Brown
Taxa named by Floyd Alonzo McClure